Mary Jane McNulty of Fort Wayne, Indiana at 22 years of age was crowned Miss Indiana 1956 (Miss America Pageant). She was prior Miss Fort Wayne, Indiana. Her talent in the Miss Fort Wayne, Miss Indiana and Miss America Pageants was soft shoe dance. 19 Miss Indiana's have subsequently been runners up or semi-finalists in the Miss America Pageant since 1938 and Miss Indiana Katie Stam won the Pageant to become Miss America 2009 (84th Miss America).

References

1930s births
Living people
American beauty pageant winners
People from Fort Wayne, Indiana